The 2001 South Carolina Gamecocks football team represented the University of South Carolina in the Southeastern Conference (SEC)  during the 2001 NCAA Division I-A football season.  The Gamecocks were led by Lou Holtz in his third season as head coach, and played their home games in Williams-Brice Stadium in Columbia, South Carolina.

South Carolina followed up one of the biggest turnarounds in college football history in 2000 with another successful season in 2001. South Carolina's game on September 20 against Mississippi State was the first NCAA Division I-A game played following the September 11 attacks. On January 1, 2002, the Gamecocks defeated Ohio State in the 2002 Outback Bowl in Tampa, Florida, and finished the season ranked #13 in both the AP Poll and the Coaches Poll.

Schedule
The November 10 game played host to ESPN's College Gameday, a first for the program. A game against Bowling Green was scheduled for September 15, but was canceled in the wake of the September 11 attacks. The game was never played. South Carolina added Wofford to the schedule to replace the open date originally scheduled for November 3.

Roster

References

South Carolina
ReliaQuest Bowl champion seasons
South Carolina Gamecocks football seasons
South Carolina Gamecocks football